Olugbenga Adelekan, also known as Olugbenga, is a Nigerian-born music producer. Olugbenga performs as a solo artist and as the bass player of the Mercury Music Prize Award-nominated band Metronomy.

Biography
Born in Lagos, Nigeria, Olugbenga moved with his family to The Hague, The Netherlands before returning to Nigeria in his teens. At the age of 16 he settled in England, where he started making original music.

Olugbenga studied English literature at King's College, Cambridge.

Olugbenga's brother Seye Adelekan is also a professional musician, playing with Gorillaz as their live bassist.

Live performances
In 2012 Olugbenga toured Asia, Australia, Russia and the UK, as well as festivals across Europe including Field Day (UK), Dot to Dot Festival (UK), off Sonar (Spain), Soundwave Festival (Croatia), Kendal Calling (UK) and Summer Sundae Weekender (UK).

Olugbenga performs using Ableton Live and MIDI controllers.

Discography
 Pink Violence - "Untitled [OLUGBENGA Edit]", 2011, Free MP3
 Youthless  "Golden Age" [Olubenga edit], 2011, MP3 file
 Ezra Bang & Hot Machine "Cadillac" [Olubenga edit], 2011, MP3 file
 Tallulah Rendall "Ghost On The Water" [Olubenga edit], 2011, MP3 file
 Error Operator "Mistakes Mk3" [Olubengla glossilalia edit], 2011, MP3 file
 Napoleon IIIrd "This Town/I Try/Leaving Copenhagen" [Olubenga edit] ft. Karl Nova, 2011, MP3 file
 Esben and the Witch "Hexagons IV" [Olubenga edit], 2011, MP3 file
 Ghostpoet "Liiines" [Olubenga ares edit], 2011, MP3 file
 Three Trapped Tigers "Reset" [Olubenga edit], 2011, MP3 file
 Diagrams "Hill" [Olubenga edit], 2011, MP3 file
 Jim Kroft - "Ulysses" [Olubenga edit], 2012 MP3 file
 Seye "White Noise" [Olubenga edit], Stranger Records, 2012, MP3 file
 Olugbenga "Epic & Blues EP [free download]", 2012, MP3 file

References

 ^ Malt Andy (23 July 2012)"Approved: Olugbenga – Epic & Blues EP" CMU. Retrieved 31 July 2012.
 ^ Torabi Genevieve (24 July 2012) EPIC & BLUES EXCLUSIVE Dazed. Retrieved 31 July 2012
 ^ On the Horizon: Epic & Blues, Olugbenga. Dots & Dashes Retrieved 31 July 2012
 ^ Murray Robin (16 July 2012) Of The Day 16/7- Olugbenga Epic & Blues EP - Ulysses Clash. Retrieved 31 July 2012
 ^ Searles Graham (19 July 2012) MP3: OLUGBENGA Mixmag. Retrieved 31 July 2012
 ^ Red Bull Studios London (19 July 2012) Mix: Olugbenga Redbull Studio. Retrieved 31 July 2012
 ^ download new music by Olugbenga (Metronomy) MOBO. Retrieved 31 July 2012
 ^ to Dot/Olugbenga Subculture. Retrieved 31 July 2012

Year of birth missing (living people)
Living people
Nigerian record producers
Alumni of King's College, Cambridge